Adler Graduate School is a non-profit educational institution located in Minnetonka, Minnesota, United States, that offers a Master of Arts Degree in Adlerian Counseling and Psychotherapy. The six areas of emphasis are Adlerian Studies, Marriage and Family Therapy, Clinical Mental Health Counseling (Licensed Professional Counseling/Licensed Professional Clinical Counseling), School Counseling, Co-Occurring Disorders, and Art Therapy.

The school offers certificate programs in Adlerian Studies, and Co-Occurring Disorders. Adler Graduate School also offers Post-Master's coursework for Licensure in Clinical Mental Health Counseling (LPC or LPCC only), Marriage and Family Therapy (LMFT only), School Counseling (Licensed School Counselor only), and Art Therapy (AT-R Credential only).

The Adler Graduate School is accredited by the North Central Association of The Higher Learning Commission (NCA).

The overarching framework of the Adler Graduate School is the vision of "Transforming Society through Social Interest in Action." Alfred Adler believed the true measure of one's overall health is displayed in their level of social interest. The Adler Graduate School manifests this social interest through its dual commitments to higher education and community service. The College takes pride in the individualized relationships with students, alumni, faculty, and staff and aspires to an organizational environment where people can serve or be served with great dignity.

The Minnesota-based Adler Graduate School and the Chicago-based Adler School of Professional Psychology are independent of one another and institutionally unaffiliated.

See also

 List of colleges and universities in Minnesota
 Higher education in Minnesota

External links

Educational institutions established in 1967
Universities and colleges in Hennepin County, Minnesota
Richfield, Minnesota
1967 establishments in Minnesota
Private universities and colleges in Minnesota